
Laguna de Arani  or Laguna de Araré is a lake in the Marbán Province, Beni Department, Bolivia. At an elevation of 160 m, its surface area is 68 km².

References

Lakes of Beni Department